Roland Boullanger (11 January 1939 – 28 July 2020) was a French breaststroke swimmer. He competed in two events at the 1960 Summer Olympics.

References

External links
 

1939 births
2020 deaths
French male breaststroke swimmers
Olympic swimmers of France
Swimmers at the 1960 Summer Olympics
Swimmers from Paris